Corybas may refer to:

 Corybas, a genus of orchid
 Corybas, a character in Greek mythology
 Corybas, a synonym for a genus of sponges (Amphilectus)